The discography of Japanese singer Kokia consists of fourteen studio albums, five compilations albums, four extended plays and 35 singles. Kokia has also released several music videos, mostly centred on her Mother Land management era with Victor Entertainment. Kokia has contributed to many soundtracks, mostly for games and anime. She has written several songs for other artists, most notably "Inori", a song sung by Mobile Suit Gundam 00 voice actor Ayahi Takagaki in the role of her character Feldt Grace.

Three of Kokia's albums and have sold over 10,000 copies, with her most successful album, 2003's Remember Me, selling 45,000 copies in Japan. Five of Kokia's singles have sold over 10,000 copies, with one of them, "The Power of Smile/Remember the Kiss," being certified gold by the RIAJ. Her 1999 single "Arigatō..." was a long-selling song digitally, and was certified gold in 2014.

Studio albums

Cover album

Live album

Compilation albums

Extended plays

Singles

Video albums

Music videos

Unlike many popular musicians, Kokia does not have very many music videos. She has three main eras of music videos: her initial Pony Canyon era clips (1998), videos filmed when under Gai Records management (2000–2002) and videos filmed while working with Mother Land management (2003–2006). Since switching to her self-managed label Anco&co, Kokia has only filmed one music video, "The Woman," while in the Tunisian Safari.

Kokia's Pony Canyon videos were featured in the DVD on Kokia Complete Collection 1998–1999. Her Mother Land videos were compiled together and released as Jewel: The Best Video Collection in 2006. Her Gai Records videos have not been released to DVD.

Other appearances

Kokia has appeared on many compilation albums, either with songs performed by her (often also written by her) or as a background vocalist.

Songwriting credits
Throughout her career, Kokia has occasionally written musical pieces for other artists, either lyrics, musical composition or both.

Notes

References 

Discographies of Japanese artists
Pop music group discographies